Acacia patagiata, also commonly knowns as salt gully wattle, is a shrub of the genus Acacia and the subgenus Plurinerves that is endemic to south western Australia.

Description
Like most species of Acacia it has phyllodes rather that true leaves. The rigid, leathery, glabrous and pungent grey-green phyllodes are ascending to erect and have an oblong-oblanceolate to elliptic shape and are slightly to shallowly to strongly incurved. It blooms from July to September and produces yellow flowers.

Taxonomy
The species was first formally described by the botanists Richard Sumner Cowan and Bruce Maslin in 1990 as a part of the work Acacia Miscellany 3. Some new microneurous taxa of Western Australia related to A. multineata (Leguminosae: Mimosoideae: Section Plurinerves) from Western Australia as published in the journal Nuytsia.
It is very similar in appearance to Acacia lineolata subsp. multilineata and also Acacia unguicula to a lesser degree. It also resembles Acacia mimica.

Distribution
It is native to an area in the Wheatbelt, Great Southern and Goldfields-Esperance regions of Western Australia where it is commonly situated along salt rivers and creeks and along the margins of salt lakes and salt pans growing in sandy, sandy-loam or clay soils. The range of the plant extends from around Pingrup in the north west to around Mount Ney in the east.

See also
List of Acacia species

References

patagiata
Acacias of Western Australia
Taxa named by Bruce Maslin
Plants described in 1990
Taxa named by Richard Sumner Cowan